Rauf Abu Al-Seoud (29 April 1915 – 19 November 1982) was an Egyptian diver. He competed at the 1936 Summer Olympics in Berlin, where he placed 12th in 10 metre platform. He also competed at the 1948 Summer Olympics.

References

External links

1915 births
1982 deaths
Egyptian male divers
Olympic divers of Egypt
Divers at the 1936 Summer Olympics
Divers at the 1948 Summer Olympics
20th-century Egyptian people